Joanna Ruiz (born 1 February 1970) is a British voice actress who has mainly done voice acting for children's television shows. She attended the Royal Welsh College of Music & Drama.

List of credits
Hilltop Hospital – Additional Voices 
Lilybuds – Rose and Bebe (2018)
Trotro – Trotro
The Adventures of Little Brown Bear - Mummy Bear, various women
Simon – Patricia and Eva (2017)
Toby's Travelling Circus – Toby, Delores, Momo and Li (2012)
Cloudbabies – Little Star and Moon (2011)
Lulu Zipadoo – Lulu and Hattie (UK & US Version) (2011)
Poppy Cat – Zuzu (UK) (2011)
Everything's Rosie – Rosie (2010)
Team Umizoomi – Geo (UK) (2010)
The Bopps – Jo Bopp (2010)
Zigby – Zara, Laurence, Vicky, Celeen, El and Tink (2009)
Wakfu: The Animated Series – Adamai (2008)
Fifi and the Flowertots – Buttercup (UK) (2005)
It's a Big Big World – Burdette (UK) (2007)
Horrid Henry – Sour Susan, Miss Lovely, Gorgeous Gurinder, Singing Soraya, Goody-Goody Gordon, Stuck-Up Steve and Bossy Bill (2006–2019)
Hana's Helpline – Mrs. Turtle, Mrs. Pig and other Mums (2006)
ToddWorld – Sophie (UK) (2006)
LazyTown – Pixel (UK) (2004–2014)
Miss Spider's Sunny Patch Friends – Squirt and Bounce (UK) (2004)
Lunar Jim – Ripple (UK) (2005–2013)
Clifford's Puppy Days – Emily Elizabeth (UK) (2004)
Fireman Sam – Sarah and James (Series 5, 2003)
Franklin – Mrs. Turtle, Beaver & Rabbit (UK) (2004) – billed as "Jo Ruiz Rodriguez"
Little Robots – Sparky 2 (USA) (2003-)
Make Way for Noddy – Tessie Bear, Martha Monkey, Miss Pink Cat, Clockwork Mouse, Mrs. Skittle and Cecilia the Beetle (UK dub) (2002)
Clifford the Big Red Dog – Emily Elizabeth and Mrs. Bleakman (UK dub) (2002)
Loggerheads – Bjorn's wife, Thora, Additional voices (1998)
Casper The Friendly Ghost – Casper (UK) (1991)
Kate & Mim Mim – Valerie and Boomer (UK) (2014–2019)
Dennis & Gnasher: Unleashed! – Mrs. Creecher and Anne Finally (2017)
Daniel Tiger's Neighbourhood - Daniel Tiger (British English dub, 2022)

References

External links
https://m.imdb.com/name/nm2676923
http://sueterryvoices.com/profile/joanna-ruiz

1970 births
Living people
Actresses from London
Alumni of the Royal Welsh College of Music & Drama
British voice actresses
Place of birth missing (living people)